Ratu Teluwaih Jinih is a local beauty pageant based in Mukah, Sarawak. Began in 2008, it is the centerpiece of the Mukah Kaul Festival, which usually lasts a week.

Background 
"Teluwaih Jinih" literally means "beautiful lady" in the Melanau language and is one of the main event during Kaul Mukah festival. It is open for participants of Melanau descent and is held to promote and enliven the festival itself. The competition has the concept of showcasing the traditional Melanau attire and contemporary attire that is prepared by the participants themselves and was conceived specially to promote the Melanau traditional attire to those people who never knew about the Melanau culture. 

Besides than promoting the culture, the competition itself also provide Melanau's women a chance and opportunities to showcase their abilities, talents and knowledge as well as to discover modelling talents among its participants. The competition is applicable to those of the Melanau race (pure or mixed), from or outside Mukah and organized by the Sri Ritma Borneo Mukah Culture Club and Melanau Mukah Association.

Many Europeans, who travelled to Kingdom of Sarawak would bring the story about how fair and beautiful Melanau girls they met. Eda Green wrote in her book in 1909;"...the Milanaus, whose girls are as fair as any Europeans and the belles of Borneo."

Winners

List of Runner-ups

Notes

References

Beauty pageants in Malaysia